Sheryl Rose Anna Marie Sonora Cruz (born April 5, 1974) is a Filipino actress and singer. She is known for her roles as Divina Ferrer in 2007's television drama series Sinasamba Kita, as Valeria in Bakekang, and in the Philippine remake of Rosalinda.

After four years out of ABS-CBN, in 2012, she had a guest appearance on the series Walang Hanggan as young Virginia "Manang Henya" Cruz, portrayed by Susan Roces. In 2013, while still a contract star of ABS-CBN, she became part of Galema: Anak ni Zuma, as Galela Carriedo.

She returned to her home network GMA in 2014, where she has been working since, being given many roles and TV appearances.

Acting career
Cruz started her career at age four. She won the FAMAS best child actress award for her portrayal in the film Mga Basang Sisiw opposite Janice de Belen, Che Che and Julie Vega. She also won best child actress for the film Roman Rapido opposite Fernando Poe Jr. She was also in the film Ang Leon at ang Kuting (1980) with Fernando Poe Jr. and in Tropang Bulilit (1981) with Niño Muhlach and Lea Salonga.

She was later contracted by Regal Films along with Kristina Paner and Manilyn Reynes to form the group 'Triplets'. Among the three, Manilyn Reynes became the Star of the New Decade and Sheryl Cruz became the Princess of Philippine Cinema. At that time, GMA Network established the youth oriented TV show That's Entertainment hosted by German Moreno, where she became part of the Wednesday group.

Her movie career blossomed as part of Philippine cinema's most memorable love teams, that of herself and Romnick Sarmenta. Cruz then signed a contract with Seiko Films. She later married and moved to the United States. In August 2004, Cruz decided to return home, and starred in her comeback film, Mano Po III: My Love, with her godmother Ms. Vilma Santos-Recto, governor of Batangas.

Cruz' biggest break was starring in two seasons of Now and Forever, Tinig and Ganti, which garnered high ratings (equivalent to that of a primetime show) despite it being in an afternoon timeslot. She appeared on Bakekang, in which her antagonist character, Valeria, became a household name. In 2007–2008, she transferred to ABS-CBN after her career on GMA when she was offered to play Miss Minchin, the main antagonist of Princess Sarah, as Xandra in Komiks Presents: Varga, and a special participation role in Lobo. She decided to transfer back to GMA Network to do Luna Mystica, opposite a former talent of ABS-CBN, Heart Evangelista.

In the mid-plot of the Sine Novela offering Tinik sa Dibdib, Cruz was cast as an additional character in the series, rumored that she was the replacement of Ara Mina. In the series, she was the lead antagonist, the love triangle between Lando (portrayed by Marvin Agustin) and Lorna (portrayed by Sunshine Dizon in the first three weeks and Nadine Samonte onwards).

After her role in Tinik sa Dibdib, Cruz was chosen by GMA Network to appear in Langit sa Piling Mo as a guest star. She also starred in the first season of the GMA reality comedy series Ang Yaman ni Lola and Grazilda.

In 2011, Cruz moved to TV5 and joined the cast of Mga Nagbabagang Bulaklak. She immediately returned to GMA after the show ended through the remake of Ikaw Lang ang Mamahalin.

In 2012, she returned to TV5 via Isang Dakot na Luha. Cruz later returned again to ABS-CBN the same year, appearing in a special participation role in the last episodes of the teleserye Walang Hanggan, playing the role of a younger Manang Henya (portrayed by her aunt Susan Roces) in flashbacks. She, along with her cousin Sunshine Cruz, also starred in the 2013 action-horror-drama series Galema: Anak ni Zuma, starring Andi Eigenmann.

On December 7, 2013, Cruz won the P1,000,000 in The Singing Bee with four consecutive correct answers.

She returned to her home network GMA once again in 2014, and was given many roles and TV appearances including the afternoon drama series Buena Familia.

In 2019, she reunited with Sunshine Dizon once again started the work in the newest drama series Magkaagaw. She played the role of Veron Razon-Santos, an ambitious woman who is Mario's ex-wife turned evil mistress as she avenged by the affair with Jio, which is played by Jeric Gonzales, who is the husband of Laura's daughter, Clarisse, which is played by Klea Pineda.

Personal life
On June 20, 2012, Cruz made a guest appearance on Eat Bulaga! segments such as "Hakot Pa More", "Music Hero" and "Bawal Judgmental". Her parents were both Sampaguita Pictures stars, Ricky Belmonte and Rosemarie Sonora. Her ethnicity is Chinese on her maternal side, Tagalog on her paternal side, and Spanish Filipino on both her maternal and paternal sides. She is the niece of actress Susan Roces. Cruz and her husband Norman Bustos were married in 1996 but filed for divorce in March 2008. They have a daughter named Ashley Nicole.

Cruz ran for councilor of Manila from the 2nd district under Pwersa ng Masang Pilipino in 2019 but lost.

Filmography

Film

Television

Discography
Sheryl (1989)
Walang Ganyanan (1991)
Row 4 (Ang Baliktorians) Soundtrack (1993)
There's No Place Like Home (2009)
Sa Puso Ay Ikaw Pa Rin (2014)

References

External links
Profile on iGMA.tv

1974 births
Living people
21st-century Filipino actresses
21st-century Filipino women singers
Actresses from Metro Manila
Sheryl
Filipino child actresses
Filipino child singers
Filipino people of American descent
Filipino people of Chinese descent
Filipino people of Spanish descent
People from Manila
People from Tondo, Manila
Pwersa ng Masang Pilipino politicians
Singers from Makati
That's Entertainment (Philippine TV series)
That's Entertainment Wednesday Group Members
GMA Network personalities
ABS-CBN personalities
TV5 (Philippine TV network) personalities